Dzianis Rutenka (born 14 February 1986) is a Belarusian handball player for Meshkov Brest and the Belarusian national team.

He is the younger brother of Siarhei Rutenka.

References

1986 births
Living people
Belarusian male handball players
Sportspeople from Minsk
Expatriate handball players